Ireland participated in the Junior Eurovision Song Contest 2019, held in Gliwice, Poland, with the song "Banshee" performed by Anna Kearney. The singer was selected though a national final organized by TG4 that between September 1 and October 6. The song was selected internally after Anna Kearney had been selected. This was Ireland's fifth appearance at the Junior Eurovision Song Contest.

Background

TG4 previously attempted to participate at the Junior Eurovision Song Contest 2014, but required funding from the Broadcasting Authority of Ireland (BAI), which was rejected.
In the 2018 contest, Taylor Hynes represented country in Minsk, Belarus with the song "IOU". He ended 15th out of 20 entries with 48 points.

Before Junior Eurovision

Junior Eurovision Éire

Heat 1
The participants in heat 1 were revealed on 26 August 2019, with the episode airing on 1 September.

Anna Kearney and Aoife McNelis both advanced to the final duel stage and performed their covers a second time. After their second performances, the jury members selected Anna as the winner of this episode, while Arabella was selected to advance to the semi-final.

Heat 2
The participants for heat 2 were revealed on 7 September 2019.

Caoimhe McBride and Katie Healy both advanced to the final duel stage and performed their covers a second time. After their second performances, the jury members selected Caoimhe as the winner of this episode, while Alison was selected to advance to the semi-final.

Heat 3
The participants for heat 3 were revealed on 13 September 2019.

Seisear Séieseach and Isabelle Moore both advanced to the final duel stage and performed their covers a second time. After their second performances, the jury members selected Seisear as the winner of this episode, while Savannah was selected to advance to the semi-final.

Heat 4
The participants for heat 4 were revealed on 22 September 2019.

Skye Murphy Darrer and Rebecca Cronin both advanced to the final duel stage and performed their covers a second time. After their second performances, the jury members selected Skye as the winner of this episode, while Orla was selected to advance to the semi-final.

Semi-final
The semi-final aired on 29 September 2019.

Anna Kearney and Savannah Phoenix-Munroe were announced as the first two finalists. Alison McGrath and Orla McDermott both advanced to the final duel stage and performed their covers a second time. After their second performances, the jury members selected Orla as the last finalist.

Final
The final aired on 6 October 2019.

Final Duel

Artist and song information

Anna Kearney
Anna Kearney (born 30 January 2006) is an Irish child singer. She represented Ireland at the Junior Eurovision Song Contest 2019 with the song "Banshee". She was born in Dublin, but she currently lives in Foxrock. Her mother, Eileen, was a performer in the Eurovision Song Contest 1994 as part of the interval act Riverdance. Shortly after the contest, Kearney opened the 2019 Late Late Toy Show.

Banshee
"Banshee" is a song by Irish singer Anna Kearney. It represented Ireland at the Junior Eurovision Song Contest 2019. After Anna Kearney had been selected to represent Ireland, TG4 contacted Niall Mooney and Jonas Gladnikoff, who had previously been responsible for the 2015 and 2018 Irish Junior Eurovision entries, to write the song. The song was also co-written by Cyprian Cassar and Daniel Caruana, with lyrics by Anna Banks, Fiachna Ó Braonáin as well as Anna Kearney.

At Junior Eurovision
During the opening ceremony and the running order draw which both took place on 18 November 2019, Ireland was drawn to perform twelfth on 24 November 2019, following Poland and preceding Ukraine.

Voting

Detailed voting results

References

unior Eurovision Song Contest
Ireland
2019